Heart of a Killer is Winter's Bane's debut album, released in 1993. It is a partial concept album, with the first six songs detailing the story of a judge who sentences a murderer to death, and soon afterwards has his heart replaced with the killer's in a transplant operation.

Heart of a Killer was re-released by Century Media in 2000, featuring a bonus disc comprising a live recording from a radio broadcast and a demo. A live recording of the band performing as a Judas Priest tribute band British Steel was submitted to Judas Priest by someone who knew the band, convincing them to hire Tim "Ripper" Owens as a replacement for Rob Halford in 1996.

Track listing
All songs written by Lou St. Paul, except for where noted.
"Wages of Sin" (Tim Owens, St. Paul) - 6:28
"Blink of an Eye" (Owens, St. Paul) - 3:59
"Heart of a Killer" - 4:24
"Horror Glances" - 5:01
"The Silhouette" - 4:34
"Reflections Within" (Owens, St. Paul) - 5:41
"Haunted House" - 3:49
"Nightshade" (Owens, St. Paul) - 5:17
"Winters Bane" (Winter's Bane) - 4:33
"Cleansing Mother" - 5:28

2000 re-issue bonus disc
"Wages of Sin"
"Blink of an Eye"
"Heart of a Killer"
"Horror Glances"
"The Silhouette"
"Reflections Within"
"Haunted House"
"Fear of Death"
"Cleansing Mother"
"My Daggers Revenge" (demo)
"Eyes of the Deceiver" (demo)
"Seven Nations" (demo)

Credits
Tim Owens - Vocals
Lou St. Paul - Rhythm, Lead and Acoustic Guitars
Dennis Hayes - Bass
Terry Salem - Drums
Gerhard Magin - Keyboards

References

Winter's Bane albums
1993 debut albums
Concept albums